Virgilio López Irias O.F.M. (born 29 Sep, 1937 in La Ceiba) was a Honduran clergyman and bishop for the Roman Catholic Diocese of Trujillo (Honduras). He became ordained in 1973. He was appointed bishop in 1987. He died in 2004.

References

20th-century Roman Catholic bishops in Honduras
1937 births
2004 deaths
People from La Ceiba
Franciscan bishops
21st-century Roman Catholic bishops in Honduras
Honduran Roman Catholic bishops
Roman Catholic bishops of Trujillo (Honduras)